Carlos Drada (born 2 September 1975) is a Colombian former professional tennis player.

Drada, a left-handed player from Cali, represented the Colombia Davis Cup team in two ties, against Canada in 1995 and the Bahamas in 2000. His only ATP Tour main draw appearance came at the 1996 Colombia Open, where he lost in the first round to Gastón Etlis in three sets. He had a best singles ranking of 607 in the world.

Now living in the United States, Drada was a collegiate tennis player for the University of Kentucky. During his junior year he had a win over James Blake, then the top ranked college player. He finished runner-up to Alex Kim in the 2000 NCAA singles championship, despite going into the tournament unseeded. In the semi-finals he again defeated the top ranked player in Jeff Morrison, who was also the defending champion.

Since 2006 he has served as the head coach of women's tennis at the University of Kentucky.

References

External links
 
 
 

1975 births
Living people
Colombian male tennis players
Sportspeople from Cali
Kentucky Wildcats men's tennis players
Kentucky Wildcats coaches
College tennis coaches in the United States
Colombian tennis coaches
20th-century Colombian people
21st-century Colombian people